Sanjeev Reddy is an Indian film director, producer and screenwriter.

Career 
Reddy made his directional debut with Login which is based on cybercrimes and its effects on netizens. The Times of India in its review wrote: "Reddy’s storytelling is interesting." The film was remade in Telugu as Ladies & Gentlemen.

In 2019, Reddy has directed his first Telugu feature film ABCD: American Born Confused Desi with Allu Sirish and Rukshar Dhillon as its leads.

Filmography

References

External links 
 

Film directors from Telangana
Living people
1983 births
Hindi-language film directors